New Politics is the debut studio album by Danish rock band New Politics. The album produced two singles, "Yeah Yeah Yeah" and "Dignity". The track "Yeah Yeah Yeah" was featured on the soundtrack of the multi-award-winning racing game Need for Speed: Hot Pursuit, as well as a 2010 Dell commercial. It was also briefly played in The Vampire Diaries season 2's fifth episode "Kill or Be Killed".

Track listing

References 

2010 debut albums
New Politics (band) albums
RCA Records albums